Hosman Ramos (born August 26, 1989) is an American soccer player who plays as a midfielder for the National Premier Soccer League club Puerto Rico Bayamón.

Early life
Ramos spent six years in the Kendal Program, two of which were with Miami FC Academy. In 2008 Ramos attended San Jacinto College in Houston, Texas where he played soccer as well from 2008 to 2009.  In 2009 Ramos moved to Mercer County Community College in Mercer County, New Jersey. In 2011 Ramos moved to Blue Star Hounders where he started his semi-pro career during the Copa Latina. In 2011 Ramos and Blue Star finished as runner-up in the Copa Latina. He then helped Blue Star win the Copa Latina one year later in 2012.

Career

Fort Lauderdale Strikers
On March 27, 2012 Ramos signed a professional contract with Fort Lauderdale Strikers of the North American Soccer League along with Lionel Brown and Darnell King. Ramos was still playing for Blue Star while in pre-season with the Strikers. Ramos made his professional debut against the Atlanta Silverbacks in the NASL on May 26, 2012 coming on as a 65th-minute substitute.

Puerto Rico Bayamón
In 2014 Ramos signed a contract with Puerto Rico Bayamón. Ramos will be playing in the Concacaf Champions League.

Career statistics

Statistics accurate as of  March 29, 2013

External links
 Fort Lauderdale Strikers bio

1989 births
Living people
American soccer players
Fort Lauderdale Strikers players
North American Soccer League players
American sportspeople of Salvadoran descent
Association football midfielders